Gateswood is an unincorporated community in Baldwin County, Alabama, United States.

History
The names Gateswood is a combination of Gates, a local family, and wood. A post office operated under the name Gateswood from 1890 to 1927.

References

Unincorporated communities in Alabama
Unincorporated communities in Baldwin County, Alabama